Rice-hull bagwall construction is a system of building, with results aesthetically similar to the use of earthbag or cob construction. Woven polypropylene bags (or tubes) are tightly filled with raw rice-hulls, and these are stacked up, layer upon layer, with strands of four-pronged barbed wire between.  A surrounding "cage" composed of mats of welded or woven steel mesh (remesh or "poultry wire") on both sides (wired together between bag layers with, for example, rebar tie-wire) and then stuccoed, to form building walls. 

Advantages (compared to earth-bag or cob) include less weight to handle/process, far better insulation values (around 3 - 4 per inch), use of an agricultural-waste product, and the sequestration of CO2. This building approach was originally innovated and tested by Don Stephens, in the northwestern U.S. in 2005.

Fireproofing 
Mixing rice-hulls in boric acid and borax solution results in fireproofing. A similar result can be achieved if placed on top of poured ingot, which applies direct heat until turned into ash. In addition, its ash form does not appeal to vermin.

See also
 Earthbag construction
 Cob construction

References

External links
  The Rice Hull House, by Paul A Olivier, Ph.D.

Construction
Building materials
Sustainable building
Appropriate technology